The 2018 Independent Volleyball Association Tournament was the men's volleyball tournament held by the Independent Universities during the 2018 NCAA Division I & II men's volleyball season. It was held April 13 through April 14, 2018 at Alderson Broaddus University's Rex Pyles Arena. The winner is eligible for the wildcard spot in the 2018 NCAA Volleyball Tournament and is granted the title of Independent Volleyball Association Champion.

Seeds
All four teams qualify for the tournament. Seeding is based on head-to-head matches during the regular season, with a tiebreaker system to seed teams with identical conference records.

Schedule and results

Bracket

References

NCAA Division I & II men's volleyball independents
2018 NCAA Division I & II men's volleyball season